Carroll is an Irish surname coming from the Gaelic Ó Cearbhaill and Cearbhall, meaning "fierce in battle".

Notable people with the surname include:

A
 Adam Carroll (racing driver) (born 1982), Northern Irish racing driver
 Adam Carroll (American musician) (born 1975), American musician
 Ahmad Carroll (born 1983), American professional football player
 Aileen Carroll (born 1944–2020), Canadian politician from Ontario
 Alfred Carroll (1846–1924), Canadian politician
 Alma Carroll (born 1924), American actress
 Alma Carroll, Irish singer with The Swarbriggs Plus Two
 Andrea Carroll (born 1946), American pop singer
 Andrea Carroll (soprano), American opera and concert soprano
 Andrew Carroll (ice hockey) (born 1985), American professional ice hockey player
 Andy Carroll (born 1989), English footballer
 Anna Ella Carroll (1815–1894), American politician, pamphleteer and lobbyist
 Aurelio Valcárcel Carroll, producer and director, from 2001–present (as of 2020), of Spanish-language telenovelas

B
 Barbara Carroll (1925–2017), American jazz pianist
 Benajah Harvey Carroll (1843–1914), American pastor and theologian
 Bill Carroll (broadcaster) (born 1959), Scottish-born Canadian radio and television personality
 Bill Carroll (musician) (born 1966), American musician
 Bill Carroll (rower) (20th century), New Zealand rower
 Billy Carroll (born 1959), Canadian ice hockey player
 Brian Carroll (born 1981), American soccer player
 Brian Patrick Carroll (born 1969), American guitarist (also known as Buckethead)
 Bryan H. Carroll (born 1967), American director, producer, screenwriter and editor.
 Bob Carroll (author) (1936–2009), American historian and sportswriter
 Bob Carroll (singer/actor) (1918–1994), American singer and actor
 Bob Carroll Jr. (1918–2007), American TV writer

C
 Charles Carroll of Annapolis (1702–1782), wealthy Maryland planter and lawyer
 Charles Carroll the Settler (1661–1720), Irish-born Maryland lawyer and planter
 Charles Carroll, Barrister (1723–1783), American statesman from Maryland, delegate to the Continental Congress
 Charles Carroll of Carrollton (1737–1832), American politician, last surviving signer of the Declaration of Independence, sometimes referred to as Charles Carroll III
 Charles H. Carroll (1794–1865), American politician, representative from New York 1843–1847
 Charles J. Carroll (1882–1942), American lawyer and politician
 Chuck Carroll (1906–2003), American football player
 Clay Carroll (born 1941), American baseball player
 Clinton Derricks-Carroll (born 1953), American actor and musician
 Corbin Carroll (born 2000), Taiwanese-American baseball player

D
 Daniel Carroll (disambiguation), several people
 David Carroll (disambiguation), several people
 Dean Carroll (1962–2015), English rugby league footballer of the 1980s and 1990s
 Deborah Carroll, actor
 Diahann Carroll (1935–2019), American actress and singer
 Dina Carroll (born 1968), English singer
 Donald Martin Carroll (1909–2002), American Roman Catholic priest

E
 Eddie Carroll (1933–2010), Canadian-born American voice actor and comedian
 Edward Gonzalez Carroll (1910–2000), American bishop
 E. Jean Carroll (born 1943), American advice columnist
 Ernie Carroll (born 1929), Australian entertainer and TV personality

F
 Francis Carroll (nuncio) (1912–1980), Irish archbishop in Liberia 
 Francis Carroll (born 1930), Australian metropolitan archbishop
 Frank Carroll (born 1938), American figure skating coach
 Fred Carroll (1864–1904), American baseball player

G
 Gabriel D. Carroll (born 1982), American professor
 George Carroll (disambiguation), several people
 Greg Carroll (born 1956), Canadian ice hockey player
 Gregory Carroll (1929–2013), American musician
 Gregory Carroll (1977–2013), American operatic tenor

H
 Harry Carroll (1892–1962), American musician and songwriter
 Helena Carroll (1928–2013), Scottish stage actress
 Henry Carroll (disambiguation), several people
 Howard Joseph Carroll (1902–1960), American Roman Catholic bishop
 Howard W. Carroll (born 1942), American politician

J
 Jack Carroll (disambiguation), several people
 Jamey Carroll (born 1974), American baseball player
 James Carroll (disambiguation), several people
 Jason Carroll (journalist), CNN correspondent
 Jason Carroll (researcher), cancer researcher
 Jason Michael Carroll, American country music artist
 Jean Carroll (1911–2010), American actress and comedian
 Jean Carroll (cricketer) (born 1980), Irish cricketer
 Jeff Carroll (born 1977), American scientist and Huntington's disease advocate
 Jeff Carroll (former American soccer player)
 Jill Carroll (born 1977), American journalist and kidnapping victim
 Jim Carroll, several people, see James Carroll (disambiguation)
 Joan Carroll (1931–2016), American actress
 Joan Carroll (soprano) (born 1932), American coloratura soprano
 Jock Carroll (1919–1995), Canadian journalist
 Joe Barry Carroll, American basketball player 
 John Carroll (disambiguation), several people
 Jon Carroll, American newspaper columnist
 Jonathan Carroll (born 1949), American author of fantasy fiction
 Joseph Carroll (disambiguation), several people
 Josie Carroll, Canadian horse trainer
 Julian Carroll (born 1931), American Governor of Kentucky 1974–1979

K
 Kevin Carroll (gridiron football) (born 1969), American football player

L
 Lara Carroll, American swimmer
 Lee Carroll, American New Age channeller
 Leo G. Carroll (1892–1972), British actor
 Lewis Carroll, pseudonym of British author Charles Lutwidge Dodgson (1832–1898)
 Liane Carroll (born 1964), English musician
 Liz Carroll, Canadian fiddler
 Louise Carroll, Scottish field hockey defender

M
 Madeleine Carroll (1906–1987), English actress
 Madeline Carroll (born 1996), American actress
 Mark Carroll (disambiguation), several people
 Mary Carroll (disambiguation), several people
 Matt Carroll (disambiguation), several people
 Mavis B. Carroll (1917–2009), American statistician 
 Mella Carroll
 Michael Carroll (disambiguation), several people, including those named Mickey or Mike Carroll

N
 Nancy Carroll (1903–1965), American actress
 Nyla Carroll (born 1965), New Zealand long-distance runner

O
 Ownie Carroll (1902–1975), American baseball player and college coach

P
 P. J. Carroll, founder of eponymous Irish tobacco company
 Pat Carroll (1927–2022), American actress
 Pat Carroll (baseball) (1853–1916), American baseball player
 Pat Carroll (basketball) (born 1982), American basketball player
Pete Carroll (born 1951), Seattle Seahawks Head Coach
 Peter Carroll (disambiguation), several people, including those named Pete Carroll
 Philip J. Carroll (born 1938), American businessman and government advisor

R
 Rick Carroll (1946–1989), program director (PD) for influential radio station KROQ-FM in Los Angeles
 Ron Carroll (born 1968), also known as "The Minister of Sound" (contemporary), American singer, songwriter and producer
 Ronnie Carroll (1934–2015), Northern Irish singer and entertainer
 Robert L. Carroll, an American vertebrate paleontologist
 Robert Todd Carroll (contemporary), American professor, author, and keeper of the Skeptic's Dictionary website
 Rory Carroll (born 1972), Irish journalist working for The Guardian
 Roy Carroll, Northern Irish footballer

S
 Sean B. Carroll (contemporary), American biologist and author
 Sean M. Carroll, theoretical physicist
 Shelley Carroll, Canadian politician from Toronto
 Sidney Carroll (1913–1988), American film and television screenwriter

T
 Thomas Carroll (disambiguation), several people, including those named Tom or Tommy Carroll
 Tonie Carroll, Australian rugby league footballer
 Tony Carroll (footballer), Scottish footballer
 Trent Carroll (born 1978), Australian rules footballer

W
 Walter Carroll (1869–1955), English composer, music lecturer and author
 Warren H. Carroll (contemporary), American historian, author, and professor
 Wes Carroll (born 1970), American percussionist
 William Carroll (Tennessee politician) (1788–1844), American, Governor of Tennessee 1821–1827 and 1829–1835
 William Henry Carroll (1810–1868), American Civil War Confederate general, son of Governor Carroll
 Will Carroll, American sportswriter

Z
 Zach Carroll, American soccer player

See also

McCarroll
O'Carroll (surname)

References

Surnames of Irish origin
Anglicised Irish-language surnames
Irish families
English-language surnames